Tiktik: The Aswang Chronicles is a 2012 Filipino action comedy horror adventure film written and directed by Erik Matti. The film stars Dingdong Dantes, Lovi Poe, Joey Marquez, Janice de Belen and Roi Vinzon. Dingdong Dantes' company AgostoDos Pictures also served as one of the producers. The film is the first full-length Filipino film entirely shot on green screen chroma key. The film received mixed to positive reviews from critics who praised its visual effects while criticizing the plot. Tiktik: The Aswang Chronicles was followed up with a sequel Kubot: The Aswang Chronicles 2 in 2014, which was also directed by Matti. The movie was produced by GMA Pictures.

Plot
Makoy (Dingdong Dantes), an arrogant and ill-mannered playboy from Manila, travels to an unnamed province to get to the town of Pulupandan in an effort to make amends with his pregnant girlfriend, Sonia (Lovi Poe). Sonia's mother, Fely (Janice de Belen), is very unhappy at his arrival and immediately asks him to leave. Sonia likewise asks him to leave, intending to break off their relationship and raise the child on her own.

Makoy calls one of his friends back in Manila from the store next door, and is convinced to make another attempt at reconciliation. The store owner, Pacing (Rina Reyes), explains a little of Sonia's background.

Makoy goes back to the house, and Sonia's father, Nestor (Joey Marquez), is more welcoming. He invites Makoy to attend Sonia's birthday celebration the next day and asks him to help shop for supplies with their house helper, Bart (Ramon Bautista). While at the town marketplace, Bart suggests they buy a pig from his cousin Ringo (Mike Gayoso) who he says can give them a discount. Nestor and Makoy then travel to the next town to meet Ringo.

A group of four rowdy kids, led by Kulot, harass the two. They are saved by Ringo, who berates his son Kulot in front of them. He also refused to give a discount to them, and Makoy urges Nestor to go back to the first marketplace instead. On their way out, however, Kulot hears that Sonia is pregnant, and offers to sell them a pig at a much lower price. Although Nestor hesitates, Makoy decides to buy it. Kulot however, is missing during the actual transaction which is completed by Hilda, Kulas and Mutya.

Nestor invites Makoy to spend the night at his house. Makoy tries again to reconcile with Sonia, although both Sonia and Fely rebuff his efforts. Makoy, Nestor and Bart then decide to have a few drinks after dinner. Makoy and Nestor later hear strange noises, reminding Nestor of tales regarding the Tiktik - a variation of aswang. He and Makoy then come back inside the house.

Meanwhile, the pig is later revealed to be a Tiktik and attacks Sonia while she sleeps. She is able to scream, and Makoy and Nestor are able to deal with it. Makoy ends up killing the creature, which turns into Kulot upon dying. Bart recognises Kulot as the latter is his nephew. This leads Makoy to accuse Bart of being an aswang too, and ties him up.

Ringo finds out about Kulot's plan, much to his chagrin. After Kulot fails to come back, he sends Kulas and Cedric to investigate. He confronts the humans after learning of Kulot's fate, revealing their status as Tiktiks. He demands an exchange - Makoy's unborn child for not attacking Nestor's family. He declines, causing the group of aswangs to begin their attack. Makoy takes Bart hostage, and drives away to draw them away.

Makoy and Bart drive to the military checkpoint near the outskirts of the town, seeking their help. Ringo and the others change back to human form, and the soldiers stand down as Ringo is familiar to them. Ringo accuses Makoy of hurting Bart. Seeing Bart still bound, the soldiers turn their attention to Makoy but are ambushed by Ringo and his group, wiping them out. Makoy and Bart take a military vehicle and crash it on to Kulas, killing him, then run back to Nestor's house.

The humans spread garlic cloves and salt - items said to have the power to repel aswangs - onto the windows and doors of the house to prevent the Tiktiks from entering.

During the standoff, Rex and his son Abel arrive at Nestor's house to deliver the items he purchased from them at the first marketplace earlier. Upon seeing the dead Kulot at Nestor's doorstep, Rex hesitates to enter despite the prodding of Nestor and Makoy. The Tiktiks emerge from the shadows and attack, killing Rex although Makoy is able to save Abel.

Ringo directs Hilda and Cedric to find an entry point. The two are able to enter through a window that has no garlic clove or salt. Cedric attacks Fely, while Hilda attacks Sonia who has begun to undergo labor. Makoy comes to Sonia's aid and kills Hilda, while an enraged Nestor kills Cedric who mortally wounded Fely.

A new group, led by their elder Tatang (Roi Vinzon), suddenly arrive. Ringo apologizes for the aswangs' deaths, but Tatang kills him. Tatang apologizes to the humans for the attack, but states that he still has to kill them all lest their presence be revealed to the rest of the townsfolk. He empowers his kin, making them less susceptible to the garlic cloves and salt, allowing them to slowly gain entry to the whole house.

Makoy convinces a mourning Nestor help him get Sonia to safety, and asks him to join him in Manila when all is said and done. He addresses Nestor as "dad", which in turn convinces Sonia to accept Makoy's reconciliation.

Bart reveals that he has been mortally wounded during their escape from the military checkpoint earlier, and decides to draw the attackers as Nestor, Makoy, Sonia and Abel quietly slip away through the backdoor. He is killed after setting off molotov cocktails, taking some of the pursuers with him.

The humans seek refuge at Pacing's store. She gives Makoy a pair of stingray's tail whips - said to be a more potent weapon against aswangs - and helps deliver Sonia's baby. Sonia, Pacing, and Mackie - the newborn child - head to the salt farm at the back of the store while Nestor, Makoy and Abel face off against the Tiktiks. Tatang, meanwhile, tracks the baby down. He transforms into a winged aswang, and is able to get Mackie. However, Sonia throws salt at him, and Makoy hits Tatang with the whip. Sonia is able to catch Mackie as Tatang is destroyed.

They then are able to be at ease for a little while, and decide to go with Makoy's earlier plan to move to Manila.

Cast
Dingdong Dantes as Makoy
Lovi Poe as Sonia
Joey Marquez as Nestor
Janice de Belen as Fely	
Roi Vinzon as Tatang
LJ Reyes as Hilda
Ramon Bautista as Bart
Mike Gayoso as Ringo
Rina Reyes as Pacing
Roldan Aquino as Capt. Rainier Regalado
Jan Harley Licana as Abel
Dwight Gaston as Rex
Cris Pastor as Mutya
RJ Salvador as Kulot
Jeff Fernandez as Kulas
Montito Almario as Cedric

Reception

Critical reception
Philbert Ortiz Dy of ClickTheCity.com rated the film 4.5 out of 5. He stated, "Tiktik: The Aswang Chronicles is a lot of fun. That may be the best way to describe it[...]The film goes to dark, violent places and asks people to laugh along. It is a genuinely unique vision that people really ought to see. The film does it all with tongue firmly in cheek, a streak of cultural satire running through the seemingly endless mayhem. And it still manages to tell a pretty decent story, with characters that feel distinctly familiar, living in a house environment that feels oddly true[...]Dingdong Dantes is really exceptional in roles that call for more of an edge. He excels at being standoffish, at having more confidence than a human should reasonably possess. The film makes great use of Dantes’ particular talents, and it makes for a very enjoyable performance".

Anton Umali of FHM Philippines also gave the film a favorable review. He stated, "If you’re expecting a conventional horror movie that will scare you by altering mood or copping out by taking the all-too-predictable gulat sequence, this isn’t it. Tiktik is fun and fresh, adapting more Grindhouse methods, like excessive violence, to boost the level of entertainment. And if you aren’t laughing your way out of the cinema, or touched by its awareness of the Pinoy penchant for emotion, you’ll probably be raging to maim, mutilate, and whip some aswang ass[...]it is an ultra-modern step in the right direction for local mainstream cinema." Neil Rara gave the film 9 out of 10 stating that, "...it’s one masterpiece worth a special place in the ranks of artistically-crafted Filipino films". He further stated, "The opening credits and title alone, which were entirely 3D animated, were worthy of praise[...]The cinematography of the movie is superb, typical of an Erik Matti film. Every scene seemed carefully shot and every shot seemed creatively composed. It was generally a well-crafted movie with a good balance of form and substance. It may still not have reached the “Hollywood-level” its producers have wished to achieve, it nevertheless set the standards by which will be judged all future films that would attempt to go high-tech"

Rianne Hill Soriano of Business World praised the film, stating "TIKTIK: The Aswang Chronicles is uniquely Filipino in its vision and presentation. Aware of its strong and weak points, it works around its resources accordingly. Proclaiming that it is the first Filipino film to be completely shot on green screen, it mixes elements of action, comedy, and horror in order to juxtapose the old sensibilities of the aswang legend with contemporary style." Jennifer Dugena of Philippine Entertainment Portal also gave the film a positive review. She stated, "[Tiktik] looks like a made-for-the-big-screen comic book because of shots divided into multiple panels and exquisitely-composed scenes with colors and settings that seem drawn to achieve a ghoulish grittiness[...] film boasts of stunning visuals and graphic novel-inspired backgrounds that exude a sense of foreboding. Filipino viewers have never seen local special effects reach this level of maturity." She further stated, "The movie is technically excellent in form. The storyline is quite simple but it is relentlessly entertaining[...]it blends modern-day genres of entertainment to create a movie aiming to be at par with Hollywood standards".

A review from Pisara gave the film 3.5 out of 5. The review stated, "...good visuals do not automatically mean "great movie." While Tiktik is wonderful to look at, it still needs help with its storytelling. Several issues pervade the movie: weak characters and several scenes that go against logic". However, he also stated, "...several actors should be given praise. Main cast members Dingdong Dantes, Lovi Poe, Janice de Belen and Joey Marquez create a believable ensemble[...]It's not a perfect movie, but it's enjoyable and the visuals are appealing to look at".

Box office
The film was shown in 105 theaters in the Philippines. On its first day, the film grossed 10 million pesos. The film debuted at number 2 on the Philippine box office behind another Filipino film, This Guy's In Love With You Mare, which was on its second week.

International Release
One of the lead stars, Dingdong Dantes, hinted in the TV show Party Pilipinas that the movie would indeed be screened internationally, although no confirmations was made by either the management of GMA Network or its distribution partner, Freestyle Releasing, or the stars themselves, as to where exactly it was scheduled to be screened, but hinted it would most likely be in film festivals initially prior to distribution in North America, the Middle East and the Asia-Pacific. But so far, nothing has been made.

Accolades
10th Golden Screen Awards
Best Visual/Special Effects winner: Dave Yu
29th PMPC Star Awards for Movies
Movie Sound Engineer of the Year Winner: Coreen de San Jose, Ditoy Aguila
Movie Supporting Actress of the Year winner: Janice de Belen

Sequel

In early 2014, Erik Matti announced that Michiko Yamamoto will write the script for a second film. It will be titled Kubot: The Aswang Chronicles. On October 25, 2014, the teaser trailer was released. Dingdong Dantes and Joey Marquez are set to reprise their roles as Makoy and Nestor, respectively. The film stars a new cast ensemble, Isabelle Daza, Elizabeth Oropesa, Jeron Teng, KC Montero, and Abra. Ramon Bautista, who played Bart in the first film, will play a new character in the sequel. Kubot: The Aswang Chronicles is one of the official entries for the 2014 Metro Manila Film Festival.

References

External links 
 
 
 
 

2012 films
Philippine action horror films
Philippine comedy horror films
Philippine monster movies
2010s Tagalog-language films
Dingdong Dantes films
GMA Pictures films
Reality Entertainment films
AgostoDos Pictures films
Films directed by Erik Matti